Vurmat is a dispersed settlement in the hills above the left bank of the Drava River in northeastern Slovenia. The main part of the settlement is in the Municipality of Podvelka and the remainder belongs to the Municipality of Selnica ob Dravi.

References

External links
Vurmat on Geopedia

Populated places in the Municipality of Podvelka
Populated places in the Municipality of Selnica ob Dravi